Mayland Heights is a residential neighbourhood in the northeast/southeast quadrant of Calgary, Alberta.  It is bounded by Barlow Trail to the east, Memorial Drive to the south, Deerfoot Trail to the west and Trans-Canada Highway to the north.

The neighbourhood of Radisson heights is to the south, Franklin/Marlborough to the east.

The land was annexed to the City of Calgary in 1910. Originally called Crossroads, the community was established in 1962.  It is represented in the Calgary City Council by the Ward 3 councillor.

Demographics 

Residents in this community had a median household income of $61,339 in 2011, and there were 12% low income residents living in the neighbourhood. As of 2011, 17% of the residents were immigrants.  A proportion of 27% of the buildings were condominiums or apartments, and 49% of the housing was used for renting. The area can also be noted for its large Italian community.

See also 
 List of neighbourhoods in Calgary

References

External links 
 Crossroads (Mayland-Belfast-Vista Heights) Community Association

Neighbourhoods in Calgary